Fabrice Boutique (born May 26, 1970 in Zaire (now Congo) is a Belgian actor of Braine-l'Alleud who is active on cinema, television, theater, musicals and dance.

Selected filmography
 Illegal (2010)
 Supercondriaque (also known as Superchondriac) (2014) directed by Dany Boon
 Le Dernier Diamant (lit. The Last Diamond) (2014)

References

External links
 

1970 births
Belgian male film actors
Belgian male stage actors
Belgian male television actors
Living people
People from Braine-l'Alleud
Place of birth missing (living people)